Inés Sastre de Jesús (born 1955 in Santurce, Puerto Rico) is a Puerto Rican botanist and plant taxonomist specializing in bryophytes.  She has served as editor of the Caribbean Journal of Science and the liverwort Neurolejunea sastreana was named for her in honor of her many contributions to bryology.

Education 
Inés studied biology at the Pontifical Catholic University of Puerto Rico, graduating in 1975 with a bachelors of science. She completed a master’s degree of science in Ecology at the University of Tennessee in 1979, completing a master’s thesis entitled “Ecological life cycle of Buchenavia capitata (Vahl.) Eichl., a late successional species in the rainforest of Puerto Rico”. In 1987 she obtained her Ph.D at the City University of New York in Biology with a thesis entitled " A Revision of the Neckeraceae Schimp. and Thamnobryaceae Marg. & Dur. in the Neotropics”. From 1990 to 1991, Inés was a Ford Foundation postdoctoral fellow at the International Institute of Tropical Forestry in Río Piedras, Puerto Rico. She completed her academic training as a postdoctoral fellow at the University of Puerto Rico, Río Piedras.

References

1955 births
Living people
People from Santurce, Puerto Rico
Pontifical Catholic University of Puerto Rico alumni
Puerto Rican botanists
Puerto Rican women scientists
University of Tennessee alumni